The Swedish men's national under 20 ice hockey team, or Juniorkronorna (Junior Crowns in Swedish) as it is commonly called in Sweden, is the national under-20 ice hockey team in Sweden. The team represents Sweden at the International Ice Hockey Federation's World Junior Hockey Championship, held annually every December and January, and is affectionately known as The Junior Crowns, referencing the men's national team Three Crowns.

Sweden's roster for the 1981 World Junior Championships when they won gold included players such as Jan Erixon, Patrik and Peter Sundström, Håkan Nordin and Lars Eriksson.

World Junior Championship record

† Includes one win in extra time (in the preliminary round)
^ Includes one loss in extra time (in the preliminary round)
* Includes one win in extra time (in the playoff round)
+ Includes one loss in extra time (in the playoff round)

References

External links 
 Swedish men's national junior hockey team all-time statistical leaders - QuantHockey

I
Junior national ice hockey teams